23 is the second EP released by Australian band The Silents.  It was released on 3 November 2007 through Ivy League Records.  According to the band "Quiet Out in Here" and "Strangers" were recorded for the album but didn't sit cohesively enough with the other tracks, whilst "Window" is an older song.

Track listing
All songs written by Benjamin Stowe, Sam Ford, James Terry and Alex Board unless otherwise noted.

 "23" – 2:29
 "Quiet Out in Here" – 1:53
 "Window" – 3:05
 "Strangers" (Benjamin Stowe, Sam Ford, Alex Board) – 3:13

References

2007 EPs
The Silents albums
Ivy League Records EPs